The Warren-Erwin House is a historic house in Natchez, Mississippi, USA.

History
The house was built prior to the American Civil War of 1861-1865 for Daniel Warren, a planter, and his wife, Elizabeth, near Washington in Jefferson County, Mississippi. In the 1870s, it was inherited by their daughter and her husband, T. J. Erwin. By 1979, it was acquired by their great-great-grandson, who moved the house to Adams County near Natchez.

Heritage significance
It has been listed on the National Register of Historic Places since March 19, 1982.

References

Houses on the National Register of Historic Places in Mississippi
Greek Revival houses in Mississippi
Houses completed in 1860
Houses in Adams County, Mississippi
Plantations in Mississippi